Yu Weili is a Chinese weightlifter who represents Hong Kong internationally. She competed at the 2012 Summer Olympics in the Women's 53 kg, finishing 9th.

References

1983 births
Living people
Hong Kong female weightlifters
Asian Games bronze medalists for Hong Kong
Olympic weightlifters of Hong Kong
Weightlifters at the 2012 Summer Olympics
Asian Games medalists in weightlifting
Weightlifters at the 2006 Asian Games
Weightlifters at the 2010 Asian Games
Medalists at the 2006 Asian Games
Chinese female weightlifters
Weightlifters from Jilin